Egypt essentially has a hot desert climate (Köppen climate classification BWh). The climate is generally extremely dry all over the country except on the northern Mediterranean coast which receives rainfall in winter. In addition to rarity of rain, extreme heat during summer months is also a general climate feature of Egypt although daytime temperatures are more moderated along the northern coast.

Prevailing wind 
The prevailing northwesterly wind from the Mediterranean Sea continuously blows over the northern coast without the interposition of an eventual mountain range and thus, greatly moderates temperatures throughout the year. Though temperatures are moderated along the coasts, the situation changes in the interior, which are away from the moderating northerly winds. Thus, in the central and the southern parts, nighttime temperatures are very hot, especially in summers where average high temperatures can exceed  like in Aswan, Luxor, Asyut or Sohag which are located in the deserts of Egypt.

Sand storms 

Every year, sometime from March to May, an extremely hot, dry and dusty wind blows from the south or the southwest. This wind is called khamasīn. When the flow of dry air continuously blows over vast desert regions, it picks up fine sand and dust particles and finally results in a dusty wind which is generally felt in the periphery of the desert. The khamasīn causes sudden, early heat waves and the absolute highest temperature records in Egypt.

Rainfall 
The cloudiest, rainiest places are in and around Alexandria and Rafah. The sunshine duration is high all over Egypt, ranging from a low of 3,300 hours along the northernmost part in places such as Alexandria to reach a high of over 4,000 hours farther in the interior, in most of the country.

Mountainous areas 
Some mountainous locations in Sinai, such as Saint Catherine, have cooler night temperatures, due to their high elevations. It usually snows on the Sinai mountains, but it almost never snows in the cities of Giza, Cairo, and Alexandria. For example, in December 2013, Cairo received a single overnight snowfall for the first time since 1901.

General information 

 Notable climatic features
Rafah and Alexandria are the wettest places
Asyut is the driest city
Aswan and Luxor are the cities with the hottest summer days
Saint Catherine has the coldest nights and coldest winters

 Cities or resorts with coolest summer days
Mersa Matruh
Port Said

 Places with least temperature fluctuation
Port Said
Kosseir
Ras El Bar
Baltim
Damietta
Alexandria

 Wettest places
Rafah
Alexandria
Abu Qir
Rosetta
Baltim
Kafr El Dawwar
Mersa Matruh

 Cities or resorts with warmest winter nights
Marsa Alam
El Qoseir
Sharm El Sheikh

 Cities with most temperature fluctuation between days and nights
Luxor
Minya
Sohag
Qena
Asyut

See also 
Geography of Egypt
Climate change in the Middle East and North Africa

References 

Egypt
Geography of Egypt
Environment of Egypt